Artur Mykytyshyn (born 14 July 2003) is a Ukrainian professional footballer who plays as a left winger for Shakhtar Donetsk.

Career
Mykytyshyn is a product of Shakhtar Donetsk youth sportive school system. He made his debut for Mariupol in the Ukrainian Premier League as a substitute player in the home match against Desna Chernihiv on 1 August 2021 which ended with a loss.

References

External links
 
 

2003 births
Living people
Ukrainian footballers
Ukrainian expatriate footballers
FC Mariupol players
III. Kerületi TUE footballers
Ukrainian Premier League players
Nemzeti Bajnokság II players
Association football forwards
Ukraine youth international footballers
Expatriate footballers in Hungary
Ukrainian expatriate sportspeople in Hungary
Sportspeople from Ivano-Frankivsk Oblast